John Steele (March 21, 1821 – December 31, 1903) was an Irish-American pioneer, local politician, physician, and astrologist. Born in Ireland, after converting to the Church of Jesus Christ of Latter-day Saints in Glasgow, Steele and his wife emigrated to Nauvoo, Illinois. Steele joined the Mormon Battalion and traveled to Salt Lake City with the Mormon pioneers. He was one of the founders of Parowan, Utah. Steele also contributed to the development of Iron, Kane, and Washington counties in Utah.

He practiced as an unorthodox physician in Toquerville, using herbs, astrology, and aspects of magic to treat patients. He could no longer practice in Utah after physician licences were required, but his knowledge of astrology and broken bone setting were still desired. His daughter, Young Elizabeth Steele, was the first white child born in Utah.

Early life
John Steele was born on March 21, 1821, in Holywood, County Down, Ireland. His parents were John and Nancy Steele, and he had two older sisters: Elisabeth and Jane. At the age of fifteen Steele worked as an apprentice shoemaker, and moved to Belfast in 1839 to start a shoemaking business. When he was nineteen, he met Catherine Campbell. She was the daughter of Michael and Mary Campbell. He married Catherine Campbell on January 1, 1840, and their daughter Mary was born on December 23. Steele's father died the next January 12.

John Steele's boot and shoe business in Belfast failed in 1840 because of poor economic conditions, which caused him to move to Glasgow, Scotland, to seek different employment. In 1841 Steele joined the Independent Order of Rechabites (IOR).  Steele was unsatisfied with his Presbyterian religion. After Steele's son John was born on June 2, 1842, Steele read the Book of Mormon. John Steele and his wife were baptized as members of the Church of Jesus Christ of Latter-day Saints in Glasgow in 1843; John on April 10 and Catherine on May 3. Steele's other child Margaret was born on June 17, 1844, and died December 18 the next year.

Pioneer and political career
John Steele and his family left for New Orleans in the United States on January 21, 1845, on the ship Palmyra. After arriving in New Orleans on March 7, they traveled to St. Louis on the Mississippi River. Soon after, they arrived in Nauvoo, Illinois. In Nauvoo he joined the Tanners and Shoemakers Association, the Nauvoo Legion, and the Masons. While Steele was absent during an expedition of the Nauvoo Legion, his family became ill and his children John and Margaret died on December 10 and December 18 respectively.

Exodus to Utah
He joined the Mormon exodus to the West on May 4, 1846. They traveled to Council Bluffs, Iowa where he enlisted as a member of the Mormon Battalion. He was a member of Company D, headed by Nelson Higgins. Instead of traveling to California through Santa Fe, Steele was directed to go to Salt Lake City with the other Latter-day Saint. Steele arrived in Salt Lake on July 29, 1847, with the Pueblo detachment. His daughter Young Elizabeth Steele, born on August 9 that year, was the first Mormon child born in Utah. Young Elizabeth Steele would study obstetrics and become a midwife. Skilled in masonry, Steele claimed to have built one-third of the first fort in Salt Lake City.

Steele faced many hardships during his winter in the Salt Lake valley. His crops were ruined by the cattle of incoming pioneers; however, his family was able to survive on cornmeal and trading milk products from their cow. Steele's 1848 crop was also ruined by insects, frost, and cattle. Steele's son Mahonri Moriancumer Steele was born on May 1, 1849. In late 1850 he was called on a mission to Iron County to start an agricultural base for the Iron Mission.

Founding of Parowan
Steele was made Lieutenant of the Light Infantry Company and the leader of ten wagons in the "Iron Batallion". They faced frostbite, freezing temperatures, and a minor irritations from Native Americans during their travels to southern Utah. Their arrival on January 13, 1851, marked the founding of Parowan. His daughter Susann was born April 28, and Steele was elected town marshal on May 24, serving for two years. He led expeditions against Native Americans who were stealing and killing their cattle. Steele was naturalized as a U.S. citizen on June 1, 1852. He was elected mayor of Parowan on June 2, 1853, and served as recorder and judge of Iron County.

John C. Frémont and his party, starving on their way to California, stopped in Parowan on February 8, 1854, and stayed for three weeks. Steele took in some of Frémont's party and loaned the explorer eight maps to copy, which were never returned. Fremont's report in the National Intelligencer reported he learned that the “route down the Virgin River had been examined the year before with a view to settlement this summer by a Mormon exploring party under the Command of Major Steele of Parawan, who (and others of the party) informed me that they found fertile valleys inhabited by Indians who cultivated corn and melons, and the rich ground in many places matted over with grape vines.”  Steele's main duty as county recorder was to record the Latter-day Saints' consecration deeds. Steele was also a journalist during expeditions on the Virgin River in 1852. Much later Steele and James Jepson of Virgin discovered how to get water from the river to the Hurricane bench (the later creation of the Hurricane Canal allowed for the settling of the city of Hurricane, Utah). Native Americans led them to their chief, who was farming at the future site of Toquerville. During the founding of the Parowan Iron Company, Steele acted as the scribe for George A. Smith; Steele was one of the signers of the document.

Las Vegas Mission
Steele's daughter Jane Catherine was born April 26, 1855, and his son Robert Henry Steele was born on September 1, 1857, but died on June 1 the next year from an overdose of calomel. Steele was called to the Las Vegas Mission in 1855. Santa Clara Native Americans traveled with the missionaries to protect them from other tribes. Steele and the other missionaries started a fort and a garden in Las Vegas, through which many settlers and Native Americans passed. Steele returned to Parowan on November 17, 1855, but returned again to Las Vegas where he became the first postmaster and president of the mission. In Las Vegas, he helped prospect for lead mines for Brigham Young.

Settlement in Toquerville
Steele and his family were early settlers of Toquerville. He was called on an Indian mission to the Navajo and Moqui Nations with Jacob Hamblin. He was appointed as postmaster of Toquerville on March 22, 1865. He became a major of the Nauvoo Legion's 10th regiment. Steele was elected justice of the peace in Toquerville on April 15, 1868 and several times thereafter. He was elected to the office of county surveyor for Kane County in 1873, and county assessor in 1874 and 1875. Steele and his son Mahonri served missions in England, 1877-1878.

Medical career

In Toquerville, John Steele worked as the town's preeminent doctor. He was known for the way that he integrated medicine, magic, and astrology. He practiced according to the ideas of Samuel Thomson. One of Thomson's theories was that elimination of toxins was key to curing patients; calomel was sometimes used to induce vomiting. Because Steele's son Robert Henry was killed by calomel, Steele preferred Thomson's herbal medicines. He considered himself a veterinarian, using an herbal "horse taming" mixture, and was known for his ability to set broken bones. He was also known for using black magic to fix problems and people in the town solicited him for horoscopes. He was called "Doc", and he was often seen wearing a blue cape with red lining. He also carried a cane and rode a horse named Charlie.  While practicing as a doctor, Steele still maintained a shoemaking business.

After the death of his wife Catherine on June 15, 1891, Steele got a temporary housekeeper. Then, 72 years old, Steele married Tamer Elizabeth Booth, on April 8, 1893. Booth was 25 years old and had been married twice. The marriage was tumultuous and only lasted a few years. After Utah began requiring licensed doctors, Steele could no longer practice medicine. He was still listed as a physician, however, in the 1903 Utah State Gazetteer and Business Directory. His knowledge of astrology and his skills for setting broken bones were still desired.

Later life
In his old age, John Steele regularly attended LDS Church services, and worked in the St. George Utah Temple. Steele was ordained a patriarch for the LDS church in 1903.

Steele developed gangrene after stepping on a nail. His own remedies couldn't cure him and an overdose of poison hemlock perhaps advanced his disease. He spent the end of his life with his daughter Elizabeth in Kanarraville. He died on December 31, 1903, and was buried in Parowan with Catherine, who had disliked Toquerville. The John Steele House in Toquerville was added to the National Register of Historic Places on April 7, 1988.

See also
 Cunning Folk Traditions and the Latter Day Saint Movement

References

1821 births
1903 deaths
People from Holywood, County Down
People from Parowan, Utah
American city founders
Mormon pioneers
Irish emigrants to the United States (before 1923)
Physicians from Utah
Harold B. Lee Library-related 19th century articles